Bazaria expallidella is a species of snout moth in the genus Bazaria. It was described by Ragonot in 1887, and is known from Algeria.

References

Moths described in 1887
Phycitini
Endemic fauna of Algeria
Moths of Africa
Taxa named by Émile Louis Ragonot